Heinrich Berté, born Heinrich Bettelheim (8 May 1858 – 23 August 1924) was an Austria-Hungarian composer of operas and operettas.

Life
Heinrich Berté was born in Galgócz, Hungary (now Hlohovec, Slovakia) in a Jewish family. At the beginning of his career, he was a relatively unsuccessful composer of ballets and an opera. In 1911 he was offered a libretto by the writer Alfred Maria Willner for an opera about Franz Schubert, based on the novel, Schwammerl by Rudolf Hans Bartsch, but this was turned down and he was told to use Schubert's music in a pastiche instead.
On 15 January 1916 his first performed work, an arrangement of Franz Schubert's Das Dreimäderlhaus was premiered in the Raimund Theater in Vienna, Gretl Schörg's voice was discovered during the run. The operetta was translated into 22 languages and in 1921 it opened as Blossom Time in New York City, in 1922 as Lilac Time in London), and was performed in over 60 countries, it was a worldwide success. The operetta was filmed several times . Berté could not build on this success, his second Schubert operetta was unsuccessful. He died in Perchtoldsdorf, Austria, aged 66.

Works

Opera
Schneeflocke (Vienna, 1896)

Operettas
Bureau Malicone (Vienna, 1891)
Der neue Bürgermeister (Vienna, 1904) - libretto by Ernst Gettke
Die Millionenbraut (Munich, 1904)
Der Stadtregent (Munich, 1905)
Der kleine Chevalier (Dresden, 1907)
Der schöne Gardist (Breslau, 1907)
Der Glücksnarr (Vienna, 1908)
Kreolenblut (Hamburg, 1911)
Der Märchenprinz (Hannover, 1914)
Das Dreimäderlhaus (Vienna, 1916; with music by Franz Schubert)
Lenz und Liebe (Budapest, 1917; with music by Franz Schubert)
Die drei Kavaliere (Vienna, 1919)
Coulissengeheimnisse (Hamburg, 1920

References

1858 births
1924 deaths
19th-century Austrian people
20th-century Austrian people
19th-century Hungarian people
20th-century Hungarian people
19th-century classical composers
20th-century classical composers
Austrian Romantic composers
Austrian opera composers
Male opera composers
Jewish classical composers
Hungarian classical composers
Hungarian male classical composers
Austrian male classical composers
Hungarian Jews
People from Hlohovec
20th-century Hungarian male musicians
19th-century male musicians
19th-century musicians
Burials at the Vienna Central Cemetery